The 2009 Rugby League Four Nations tournament (officially known as the Gillette Four Nations due to sponsorship) was the first Rugby League Four Nations since its expansion from the Tri-Nations tournament. Played in England and France over three weeks from Friday, 23 October until Saturday, 14 November, France and England competed for the first time, with Great Britain's permanent split into the home nations' national teams following the 2007 New Zealand All Golds Tour. The tournament culminated in a final between world number 1 side Australia and hosts England. After 60 minutes of highly competitive football, Australia ran away with the match, scoring a barrage of late tries to win 46–16.

The 2009 series was the first of three Four Nations series planned before the 2013 Rugby League World Cup, with the venues rotating between Europe and the South Pacific. The RLIF also stated that the next Four Nations would be held 2010.

Qualification 
The Four Nations is run in partnership between the Australian Rugby League, Rugby Football League and New Zealand Rugby League representing the top three nations in the sport: Australia, England and New Zealand. A fourth partner, Fédération Française de Rugby à XIII, accepted an invitation to enter France in the inaugural 2009 tournament.

Participating teams 
Each team was to play the other three once during the round robin tournament. The top two finishing teams would then contest the final.

Squads 
Each nation was to choose a 24-man squad in order to participate for the Four Nations.

Australia 
Australian coach Tim Sheens' squad for the tournament was:

*Replaced originally selected Israel Folau who withdrew due to injury.

Of the twenty four players, twenty three were Australian born while one was Fijian born.

New Zealand 
Coach:  Stephen Kearney

Of the twenty four players, nineteen were New Zealand born while four were Australian born and one Tongan born.

1 Ruled out of the rest of the series on 5 November after breaking his hand in the Round two victory over France.

2 Registered as a member of the squad before the tournament started but this was not revealed to the media until he was called to Europe from Australia by the Kiwis on 25 October.

3 The only non National Rugby League player in the squad.

England 
Coach:  Tony Smith

All twenty four players were English born.

1 Replaced originally selected Sean O'Loughlin who withdrew due to injury.
2 The only non Super League player in the squad.

France 
Coach:  Bobbie Goulding

Of the twenty seven players, eighteen were French born while three were Australian born, three New Zealand born, one Moroccan born and one New Caledonia born.

 Casey McGuire was initially named in the squad but withdrew after "an exhausting Super League season". He cannot be replaced.
 Rémi Casty suffered a series-ending broken hand in the first match against England.
 Artie Shead, James Wynne, Andrew Bentley and Nicholas Piquemol were added to the squad for the match vs New Zealand after several squad members came down with Swine Flu.

Referees 
Four referees were nominated for the tournament by the governing bodies of the participating teams. One from each of the participating nations. The nominated referees were:
 Thierry Alibert 
 Steve Ganson 
 Shayne Hayne 
 Leon Williamson

Venues 
There were several venues used during the tournament throughout England and France.

Final 
The Four Nations Final was played at the Elland Road stadium in Leeds, England.

Round one

England vs France 

After trailing 12–4 at half-time, England scored 30 consecutive points to defeat France 34–12, who were coached by former Great Britain half, Bobbie Goulding.

New Zealand vs Australia 
For Australia Ben Hannant, Brett Morris and Brett White were selected to make their debuts. Petero Civoniceva was selected despite not having played any football since he injured his leg in game 2 of the 2009 State of Origin series in June.

When Australian captain Darren Lockyer took the field for this match, he surpassed Mal Meninga's record for most international caps for the Kangaroos. After 6–6 at half-time, Australia quickly went to a 14–6 lead before New Zealand scored fourteen points in a row to make it 14–20. Australia's Cameron Smith scored a try and Johnathan Thurston made the conversion to level the scores with less than five minutes left to play. The score finished at 20-20. The crowd of 12,360 at Twickenham Stoop stadium set a new attendance ground record for a rugby league match.

Round two

England vs Australia 
Changes made to the Australian side included the removal of Sam Thaiday, Ryan Hoffman, Trent Waterhouse and Kurt Gidley. Taking their places were débutants Luke Lewis and David Shillington as well as Robbie Farah and also Nathan Hindmarsh, making his test football comeback.
Australian captain Darren Lockyer equalled Ken Irvine's record of 33 test tries for Australia by scoring in this match. On a warm and sunny day, the Kangaroos went into half-time 26-0 up and after Australia defeated England 52–4 in their previous meeting in last year's Rugby League World Cup, the English looked set for another thrashing. However, England made an ambitious fight-back in the second half but, keeping Australia scoreless to lose by a more respectable margin of 26–16. Towards the end of the match, Johnathan Thurston was sent to the sin bin.

New Zealand vs France 
New Zealand were leading 16–6 at half-time. France got to within 4 points of New Zealand at 16-12 before New Zealand scored 46 points in a row to comfortably win 62–12. New Zealand's Bryson Goodwin scored 22 individual points and Sam Perrett scored a hat-trick of tries. This loss ended the French hopes of making the finals.

Round three

Australia vs France 
The Kangaroos had not played in Paris since 1994. They went into the match having won their last 14 matches against France. Due to French laws prohibiting the use of alcohol advertising in sport, the Australian jerseys' usual Victoria Bitter logo was replaced by one for Movember. Debuting for Australia were Brett Morris' twin brother Josh Morris and New South Wales State of Origin centre Michael Jennings. By playing in this match, Darren Lockyer surpassed Clive Churchill's record for most games as Australian captain.
For the first 20 minutes the contest was quite even, being played at both ends of the field with both sides getting and conceding penalties. It was the Australians who scored first when debutant Michael Jennings dummied his way through the defence from 20 metres out to score out wide. Johnathan Thurston's conversion attempt missed, so France were down 4 nil with 18 minutes of the first half remaining. Jennings also scored the second try of the match in the 27th minute when Lockyer threw a cutout pass to him in front of France's line. Thurston again failed to add the extras, so the score remained at 8 nil. The score did not change from then till half time, with both sides' defence holding each other's attacking opportunities out.

After receiving France's kick-off and making their way up-field with the help of a penalty, the Australians scored in only the 2nd minute of the half when Luke Lewis powered his way through the defence from about 12 metres out. With Cooper Cronk on the field instead of Johnathan Thurston, Kurt Gidley was given kicking duties and converted the try, pushing Australia's lead out to 14 nil. In the 45th minute the Kangaroos scored again after a Cooper Cronk 40/20 kick put them in an attacking position and they moved the ball out to Brett Morris' wing where he dived over untouched in the corner. Gidley's sideline conversion attempt missed so the score was 18 nil. Morris got his second try just a few minutes later when Darren Lockyer kicked ahead for him from 35 metres out. Gidley kicked the extras so Australia's lead was 24 nil. the Kangaroos continued to dominate possession and in the 56th minute Jennings got his hat-trick with a long-range try when he regathered a French dropped ball 30 metres out from Australia's line. Jennings thus became the 4th Kangaroo since Lionel Morgan in 1960, Brad Mackay in 1990 and David Williams in 2008 to score a hat-trick on debut for Australia. Thurston, back on the field kicked his first successful goal of the match to push the score out to 30 nil with over 25 minutes of play to go. In the 61st minute France made the most of an attacking opportunity when Tomas Bosc kicked over the Australian defence where Olivier Elima leapt for it, coming down with the ball over the line. Bosc's conversion attempt missed so the score was 30–4 with 18 minutes remaining. Josh Morris then got a try at the 69-minute mark when he received the ball from his twin brother Brett after the Australians had kept the ball alive. Thurston kicked the extras so the score was 36–4. Josh Morris then got his second try a little over 2 minutes later when the Australians moved the ball out to his wing from a scrum win 30 metres out. Thurston's successful conversion made the score 42-4 and this is what it would be at the final whistle.

The victory for Australia meant they would face the winner of the match between New Zealand and England to be played in Huddersfield later that evening.

New Zealand vs England 
The last time these two sides met was in the 2008 World Cup when they played each other for the chance to face Australia in the final. On that occasion New Zealand won, sending England back home. This time they were playing for the chance to face Australia in the Four Nations final. New Zealand could draw and still make the final, while England needed to win to advance. In all of England's prior games, they had lost the first half but had won and not conceded a point in the second half.
For this match England coach Tony Smith dropped Danny McGuire, Lee Smith and Tom Briscoe in favour of Peter Fox, Chris Bridge and Jon Wilkin. For New Zealand, Greg Eastwood and Steve Matai were out with injury so Jeff Lima was recalled and 19-year-old Kieran Foran was brought in to make his international debut ahead of Krisnan Inu.

England got the first points of the match when they attacked up the middle, Sam Burgess spinning out of a tackle to send Kyle Eastmond over under the black dot just on 9 minutes. Sinfield's conversion from right in front was successful so England were out to a 6 nil lead. New Zealand responded 5 minutes later, moving the ball out wide to Bryson Goodwin's wing where he dived over in the corner. He couldn't convert his own try though, so the score was left at 6–4. In the 29th minute New Zealand were awarded a penalty right in front of the goal-posts and took the two points, leveling the score at 6 all. Six minutes later England were up at the Kiwis' end of the field again, attacking the line, when Sam Tomkins kicked across-field to Peter Fox's corner where the winger dived on the ball. Sinfield kicked the extras from the sideline so England were again a converted try in front with just over 4 minutes remaining. England continued dominating field position and scored again in the 39th minute from a scrum win near England's line, the ball going through the hands out to Peter Fox to score his second. Sinfield again added the extras, pushing England's lead out to 18–6.

New Zealand opened the scoring after just a minute and a half into the second hand when at the halfway line Isaac Luke made a break from dummy-half, his offload finding support players who got the ball out to Ben Matulino who scored. Bryson Goodwin's kick added the extras, bringing the Kiwis back within a converted try, trailing 18–12. The play for the next half-hour went from end to end, with both teams getting good attacking opportunities but both teams' defences holding them out. Then when England were close to New Zealand's line they were awarded a penalty for ruck interference and with less than 10 minutes remaining, decided to take the kick for an 8-point lead. Sinfield's kick was successful so the score was 20–12 in favour of the home team. England were able to hold New Zealand out for the remaining minutes of the match and so earned a place in the final. Kevin Sinfield, in the unfamiliar position of hooker was named man-of-the-match.

Tournament Ladder

Final 
The Australian team for the final had the Queensland team's halves pairing, front row, centre pairing and fullback, while both wingers, the whole back row, three-quarters of the bench and the coach were New South Walshmen.

By playing in this match, Darren Lockyer became the first Australian in history to play in fifty international matches for his country. In addition, teammate and fellow Queenslander, Petero Civoniceva became the most-capped forward, breaking Johnny Raper's record by earning his 40th cap.

It took Australia till the ninth minute to cross England's line. Quick passing out to Brett Morris on the right wing saw him dive over in the corner, but the video referee ruled that he'd lost control of the ball in the grounding of it so no try was allowed. In England's very next set of six, they had reached Australia's half when NRL-bound loose forward Sam Burgess charged through the Kangaroos' defence, running forty-five metres and dummying past the fullback to score under the posts. Sinfield's conversion put England ahead 6 nil after eleven minutes of play. In the fourteenth minute Australia responded: a cut-out pass from Johnathan Thurston on England's try-line was flicked on by Justin Hodges' fingertips to Morris, who this time got his try. Thurston kicked the conversion from near the sideline so the scores were level at 6 all. A few minutes later England were back attacking Australia's line, when on the final tackle Eastmond put a kick up to his right winger Peter Fox, who beat Jarryd Hayne in the leap for the ball to come down with the try, putting the home team back in front. Sinfield missed the conversion attempt so the score was 10–6 with twenty minutes of the first half remaining. Five minutes later Hayne made a good break from half way, kicking ahead for Greg Inglis to chase through and ground the ball. The video referee checked Inglis' grounding and gave him the benefit of the doubt. Thurston kicked the extras so Australia had the lead again 12–10 with fourteen minutes of the first half left. At the thirty-minute mark England were penalised right in front of their goal posts and Australia opted to take the kick, Thurston's boot pushing Australia's lead out to four. No further points were scored in the first half so they went into the break at England 10, Australia 14.

After ten minutes of sustained pressure on Australia's defence England were through, Burgess again charging over under the posts from close range. Sinfield's kick added the Extras so once again England had the lead at 16–14. A little over three minutes later it was Australia attacking England's line when their fullback Billy Slater dove over from dummy-half, the lead changing again to be back with the Kangaroos. Thurston couldn't get the conversion so Australia's lead stayed at only two points, 18–16. In the fifty-eighth minute the Kangaroos were on the attack again when Thurston chipped ahead from twenty metres out for Brett Morris to chase through and score in the corner behind the England defence. The conversion attempt by Thurston was missed so Australia lead 22–16 with twenty-one minutes of the match remaining. Shortly after the kick-off following the try England's Michael Shenton suffered a head clash when trying to tackle front-row forward Ben Hannant and the game was halted as he was stretchered unconscious from the field. Moments after the restart of play Hannant himself was concussed when tackled by James Graham but played on. Australia scored a remarkable try after sixty-six minutes when Darren Lockyer chipped over the top into England's in goal and Slater, chasing through leapt over the dead ball line to slap the ball back in with his hand for Cameron Smith to dive on and claim the four points. Thurston's kick from right in front did not miss so Australia lead 28–16. As the Kangaroos returned the ball after a short kick-off from England they reached the opposition's end of the field and Slater scored again after backing up a good break from Smith. The conversion from Thurston was an easy one so the score was 34–16 in favour of the visitors with under ten minutes of the match remaining. In the seventy-third minute Jarryd Hayne got a try after running through to chase a Lockyer grubber. Thurston added the extras, Australia's lead now 40–16 with a little over five minutes left to play. The Australians got one more try though when Kurt Gidley made a break around the halfway line and kicked ahead, Billy Slater winning the race to the ball to claim his hat-trick in the seventy-seventh minute. Man-of-the-match Thurston added the extras so the score was 46-16 when the final hooter sounded. It was England's heaviest loss to Australia on home soil.

Non-series Tests 
Before the series, New Zealand and England played additional Tests against Tonga and Wales respectively.

New Zealand vs Tonga 

New Zealand led 24–8 at half-time before Tonga fought back to level the scores at 24-24. New Zealand went on to score 16 unanswered points to win the match 40–24.

Wales vs England 

England lead Wales 20-12 approaching the hour, before racking up 28 points in the last quarter..

Awards 
 Greg Inglis of Australia was named Player of the Tournament.
 Brett Morris of Australia was the tournament's Top Try Scorer with 6 tries.
 Johnathan Thurston of Australia was the tournament's Top Point Scorer with 38 points.

Broadcast details 
The competition was televised in Australia, New Zealand, Great Britain and France.
 In Australia, matches were broadcast on Channel Nine.
 In New Zealand, SKY Network Television showed all games live.
 In the United Kingdom, BBC Sport broadcast the first England v Australia match and France v Australia live, with all other matches shown by Sky Sports. Both networks showed highlights programmes. It was the first time terrestrial television had shown international rugby league in the United Kingdom since the 2000 World Cup.
 In France, Orange Sport had rights to the tournament.
 In the United States, from the second round onward, the games were available on ESPN360.

References

External links 
 Official Site (as archived September-2009)
 Australia face NZ in Four Nations opener AAP, 23 February 2009

Rugby League Four Nations
Four Nations
Rugby League Four Nations
Rugby League Four Nations
Four Nations
International rugby league competitions hosted by France
International rugby league competitions hosted by the United Kingdom